Town Close School is an independent preparatory school located in Norwich, England. The heart of the School is two large town houses, one early Georgian and the other mid-Victorian. Purpose-built classrooms have been added in recent years along with an indoor heated swimming pool and a state of the art sports hall, attracting national attention. In more recent times they have bought an Astro-turf pitch with the Hewett School.
In 2020 the school won the Tes Independent pre-prep of the year. Many pupils go on to attend the Norwich School with some attending Oundle, Stowe, and Greshams.

Sports
The school has attained notable sporting success, with one pupil becoming the under-12 girls’ national javelin champion in July 2011, and 2 other pupils being placed in the National Prep Schools Athletics Championships, held at the Alexander Stadium in Birmingham.

Playing field 
The school has a playing field situated further out from the city on the Newmarket Road.  Norwich City Football Club played at this Newmarket Road site from 1902 to 1908, with a record attendance of 10,366 against Sheffield Wednesday in a second round FA Cup match in 1908.  Following a dispute over the conditions of renting the Newmarket Road ground, in 1908, the club moved to a new home, in a converted disused chalk pit in Rosary Road which became known as "The Nest".

Notable former pupils 

Richard Alexander - England hockey international
Brian Perry -  veterinary surgeon and epidemiologist
Peter Jarrold

References

External links 
Official website

Preparatory schools in Norfolk
Educational institutions established in 1932
Single sex schools that were converted to mixed in Norfolk
1932 establishments in England
Schools in Norwich